Ismael Ramzi (29 August 1917 – 8 January 2000) was an Egyptian diver. He competed at the 1936 Summer Olympics and the 1948 Summer Olympics.

References

External links
 

1917 births
2000 deaths
Egyptian male divers
Olympic divers of Egypt
Divers at the 1936 Summer Olympics
Divers at the 1948 Summer Olympics
Place of birth missing
20th-century Egyptian people